The Appalachian and Ohio Railroad  is a class III railroad operating in West Virginia.

Originally the Cowen and Pickens Subdivisions of the Baltimore & Ohio Railroad, the railroad was a part of CSX until it was leased to Watco, which began operating the railroad on March 25, 2005.  Watco only held the line for a short time before turning the lease from CSX over to Four Rivers Transportation, now P&L Transportation, on May 15, 2006.

The railroad operates 158 miles of track between Grafton and Cowen. It has one active branch, a portion of the Pickens Subdivision that connects Alexander to the main line at Hampton.

The A&O's main customers are coal mines, although it carries smaller amounts of chemicals and wood.  Among the six coal mines it serves is the Sago Mine, site of the Sago Mine disaster in 2006.

It connects with three other railroads:
CSX, at Grafton
Beech Mountain Railroad (BEEM), at Alexander
West Virginia Central Railroad (WVC), at Tygart
All of these railroads are currently active, including the BEEM regularly loading coal trains since 2008 and the WVC regularly bringing freight trains to the interchange at Tygart.

Locomotive Roster
The A&O railroad uses CSX locomotives to move the empty and loaded cars coal trains to and from customers. They currently have two CEFX EMD SD90MACs for helper services in the Burnsville area, four EMD GP38s (#s 2631, 2634,2638, and 2662), and two GP38-2's (#s 2665 and 2670) for various switching and local tasks. All Watco motive power, including twenty EMD SD50s (#5101-5120) four EMD GP50s (5010-5013) and five EMD GP38s (ex-Bangor & Aroostook) went to other Watco operations.

References

External links
Railroad website
Locomotive roster

West Virginia railroads
2005 establishments in West Virginia
Watco
Spin-offs of CSX Transportation